The Flag of Niger has been the national flag of the Republic of the Niger since 1959, a year prior to its formal independence from French West Africa. It uses the national colors of orange, white and green, in equal horizontal bands, with an orange roundel in the center. The flag forms one of the official national symbols of the Republic of the Niger, along with the coat of arms, the National Anthem ("la Nigérienne"), and the national motto: "Fraternité, Travail, Progrès".

Legal definition 
Prior to independence from French West Africa, the flag of Niger was adopted by the Territorial Assembly of the Niger Colony on 23 November 1959, shortly before the proclamation of the Republic within the French Community on 18 December 1959. The flag was designed in 1958.  It was retained upon independence in 1960 and has remained unchanged through to the 2010 Constitution.

Symbolism
A number of sources have described the symbolic intent of the flag, although official sources have yet to confirm. Common interpretations are that the upper orange band represents the northern regions of the Sahara Desert, or the Sahel, the center white band represents purity, or the Niger River, and the lower green band represents both hope and the fertile regions of southern Niger. The orange disc in the center band is thought to stand for the sun or independence.

Ratio 
The flag's traditional portrayal with an unusual 6:7 ratio is of unknown significance and is not used consistently in print applications of the Nigerien government.

Historical flags

Other flags

Military flags

Ethnic group flags

See also 
 Coat of arms of Niger

Notes

References 

 Portions of this article were translated from the German language Wikipedia article :de:Flagge Nigers, (consulted 2008-07-25).
 W. Smith, O. Neubecker: Die Zeichen der Menschen und Völker: Unsere Welt in Fahnen und Flaggen. Reich Verlag Luzern, 1975, 
 Flag of Niger at FOTW, (consulted 2008-07-25).

Further reading
 

National symbols of Niger
Niger
Niger
Niger